Al-Jadriya is a neighborhood in Baghdad, Iraq along the Tigris river. Al-Jadriya shares a  significant but comparatively smaller part of the peninsula with Karrada. Al-Jadriya lies at the south tip of the peninsula where Tigris river makes its major turn and heads to the north-east. Its significance comes from the quality of life style of the neighborhood.

Jadriya